Willow Grove is a census-designated place (CDP) in Montgomery County, Pennsylvania, United States. A community in Philadelphia's northern suburbs, the population was 13,730 at the 2020 census. It is located in Upper Dublin Township, Abington Township and Upper Moreland Township. Willow Grove was once known for Willow Grove Park, an amusement park that was open from 1896 to 1976, now the site of Willow Grove Park Mall. Willow Grove is considered an edge city of Philadelphia, with large amounts of retail and office space.

Naval Air Station Joint Reserve Base Willow Grove was located northwest of the Willow Grove CDP in Horsham Township. NAS JRB Willow Grove transitioned into Horsham Air National Guard Station in September 2011. 

Geography
Willow Grove is located at  (40.146109, -75.116641).

It has a hot-summer humid continental climate (Dfa) bordering upon a humid subtropical climate (Cfa) and its hardiness zone is 7a. Average monthly temperatures range from 31.8 °F in January to 75.9 °F in July.

Demographics
As of the 2010 census, the CDP was 81.4% White, 8.2% Black or African American, 0.2% Native American, 4.9% Asian, 1.1% were Some Other Race, and 2.3% were two or more races. 3.5% of the population were of Hispanic or Latino ancestry.

As of the census of 2000, there were 16,234 people, 6,389 households, and 4,255 families residing in the CDP. The population density was 4,485.7 people per square mile (1,731.5/km2). There were 6,582 housing units at an average density of 1,818.7/sq mi (702.0/km2). The racial makeup of the CDP was 88.57% White, 6.58% African American, 0.09% Native American, 3.06% Asian, 0.02% Pacific Islander, 0.48% from other races, and 1.21% from two or more races. Hispanic or Latino of any race were 1.57% of the population.

There were 6,389 households, out of which 30.0% had children under the age of 18 living with them, 53.3% were married couples living together, 10.0% had a female householder with no husband present, and 33.4% were non-families. 28.1% of all households were made up of individuals, and 11.3% had someone living alone who was 65 years of age or older. The average household size was 2.46 and the average family size was 3.05.

In the CDP, the population was spread out, with 22.9% under the age of 18, 6.5% from 18 to 24, 31.7% from 25 to 44, 21.4% from 45 to 64, and 17.4% who were 65 years of age or older. The median age was 38 years. For every 100 females, there were 89.3 males. For every 100 females age 18 and over, there were 85.5 males.

The median income for a household in the CDP was $50,378, and the median income for a family was $62,163. Males had a median income of $40,393 versus $32,451 for females. The per capita income for the CDP was $24,740. About 2.8% of families and 4.9% of the population were below the poverty line, including 4.5% of those under age 18 and 4.0% of those age 65 or over.

Economy
Asplundh Tree Expert Company is based in Willow Grove.
China Airlines operates the Philadelphia Mini Office (Chinese: 費城營業所 Fèichéng Yíngyèsuǒ) in Building 39G at 2300 Computer Avenue in the Willow Grove CDP and in Upper Moreland Township.

Infrastructure

Transportation

Willow Grove is served by the Willow Grove Interchange (exit 343) along the east–west Pennsylvania Turnpike (Interstate 276), which connects to Pennsylvania Route 611. Major roads serving Willow Grove are Pennsylvania Route 611 (Old York Road/Easton Road), Pennsylvania Route 263 (York Road), Pennsylvania Route 63 (Moreland Road), Fitzwatertown Road, Terwood Road, Davisville Road, Easton Road, and Old Welsh Road.

Willow Grove is served by the Willow Grove station on SEPTA Regional Rail's Warminster Line, which runs between Warminster and Center City Philadelphia. The community is served by five SEPTA bus routes, with a transit hub at the Willow Grove Park Mall. The Route 22 bus runs between Olney Transportation Center in North Philadelphia and Warminster via Willow Grove and the Route 55 bus runs between Olney Transportation Center and Doylestown via Willow Grove. Both the Route 22 and 55 buses have several trips from Olney Transportation Center that terminate at the Willow Grove Park Mall. The Route 95 bus runs between the Willow Grove Park Mall and Gulph Mills. The Route 310 and Route 311 buses connect the Willow Grove station and the Willow Grove Park Mall to business parks in Horsham.

Norfolk Southern Railway's Morrisville Line freight railroad line passes through Willow Grove, running parallel to the south of the Pennsylvania Turnpike.

Utilities
Electricity and natural gas in Willow Grove is provided by PECO Energy Company, a subsidiary of Exelon. Water in Willow Grove is provided by Aqua Pennsylvania, a subsidiary of Aqua America. Trash and recycling collection in the Willow Grove area is provided by the respective townships. Cable, telephone, and internet service to the area is provided by Xfinity and Verizon. Willow Grove is served by area codes 215, 267, and 445.

Health care
Jefferson Health–Abington operates the Jefferson Health–Willow Grove (formerly Abington Health Center–Willow Grove) health center in Willow Grove. The health center, which was founded in 1983, consists of four buildings and offers outpatient hospital services including healthcare programs, medical and administrative offices, and conference and educational facilities.

Education
Public school districts:
 Abington School District
 Upper Dublin School District
 Upper Moreland School District

The area Catholic school is Queen of Angels Regional Catholic School in Willow Grove and Upper Moreland Township. Queen of Angels was formed in 2012 by the merger of St. David in Willow Grove and Our Lady Help of Christians in Abington.

Notable people
 Jill Biden, First Lady of the United States 
 Stewart Greenleaf, State Senator, 12th district
 Edwin Hallowell, Democratic member of the U.S. House of Representatives; born in Willow Grove
 Enolia McMillan, first female national president of the NAACP; born in Willow Grove
 Chris Raab, professional stuntman and actor.

In popular culture
 In the song "Please Don't Tell My Father That I Used His 1996 Honda Accord To Destroy The Town Of Willow Grove, Pennsylvania In 2002", by pop punk band Pet Symmetry, Evan Weiss (also of Into It. Over It.) describes his actions vandalizing Willow Grove as a teenager.

 In the American comedy-drama "The Goldbergs", the main cast visits the Willow Grove Park Mall in numerous episodes.

References

External links

Abington Township
Upper Moreland Township

Census-designated places in Montgomery County, Pennsylvania
Census-designated places in Pennsylvania